I.S.P.E Football Club is a Burmese football club, based at Mandalay Division, Myanmar.

2023 Final Squad

References

External links

Association football clubs established in 2019
Myanmar National League clubs
Football clubs in Myanmar